Basin Electric Power Cooperative is a wholesale electric generation and transmission cooperative based in North Dakota that provides electricity to 2.8 million customers in nine U.S. states.  The roots of the cooperative go back to 1960 when Leland Olds and ten power suppliers created Giant Power Cooperative.  Giant Power was first going to be a generation and transmission cooperative, but to keep electricity cheaper for rural customers, Basin Electric Power Cooperative was started in 1961.  Today, Basin Electric's power sources include coal, natural gas, hydroelectric, wind, waste heat, and nuclear. The current CEO and General Manager is Paul Sukut. A subsidiary of Basin Electric, Dakota Gasification Company, operates the Great Plains Synfuels Plant, which captures and sequesters nearly 50% of its carbon dioxide emissions in a system developed during the Carter administration. In 2005, the membership of Basin Electric passed a resolution requiring 10 percent of electricity demand to be provided by renewable forms of energy. At the end of 2009, Basin Electric finished construction on a 77 turbine wind energy project.

Member cooperatives

Direct purchasing
Grand Electric Cooperative - Bison, South Dakota
KEM Electric Cooperative - Linton, North Dakota
Minnesota Valley Cooperative Light & Power Association - Montevideo, Minnesota
Minnesota Valley Electric Cooperative - Jordan, Minnesota
Mor-Gran-Sou Electric Cooperative - Flasher, North Dakota
Powder River Energy Corporation - Sundance, Wyoming
Roughrider Electric Cooperative - Hazen, North Dakota
Rosebud Electric Cooperative - Gregory, South Dakota
Wright-Hennepin Cooperative Electric Association - Rockford, Minnesota

G&T
Central Power Electric Cooperative - Minot, North Dakota
Central Montana Electric Power Cooperative - Great Falls, Montana
Corn Belt Power Cooperative - Humboldt, Iowa
East River Electric Power Cooperative - Madison, South Dakota
L & O Power Cooperative - Rock Rapids, Iowa
Northwest Iowa Power Cooperative - LeMars, Iowa
Rushmore Electric Power Cooperative - Rapid City, South Dakota
Upper Missouri G&T Electric Cooperative - Sidney, Montana
Tri-State Generation and Transmission Association - Denver, Colorado

Class D Members
Flathead Electric Cooperative - Kalispell & Libby, Montana
Wyoming Municipal Power Agency - Lusk, Wyoming

States served by Basin Electric
Colorado
Iowa
Minnesota
Montana
Nebraska
New Mexico
North Dakota
South Dakota
Wyoming

Subsidiary companies
Basin Telecommunications Inc.
Basin Cooperative Services
Dakota Gasification Company 
Dakota Coal Company
Montana Limestone Company
Prairie Winds ND 1, Inc.
Prairie Winds SD 1, Inc.
Souris Valley Pipeline Ltd.

Board of directors

Source:

External links
Basin Electric Power Cooperative website

References

Electric cooperatives in North Dakota
Electric generation and transmission cooperatives in the United States
Companies based in North Dakota